Uncial 0127 (in the Gregory–Aland numbering), ε 54 (Soden), is a bilingual Greek–Coptic uncial manuscript of the New Testament, dated palaeographically to the 8th century.

Description 
The codex contains a small part of the John 2:2-11, on one parchment leaf. The text is written in two columns per page, 22 lines per page, 6-9 letters in line, in large uncial letters.

The Greek text of this codex is a representative of the mixed text-type. Aland placed it in Category III.

Probably it was written in Egypt. It was found in the White Monastery in Egypt.

Formerly it was designated by siglum Tq. In 1908 Gregory gave siglum 0127 to it.

It is dated by the INTF to the 8th century.

The codex is located now at the Bibliothèque nationale de France (Copt. 129,10 fol. 207) in Paris.

See also 

 List of New Testament uncials
 Textual criticism
 Uncial 0128

References

Further reading 

 E. Amélineau, Notice des manuscrits coptes de la Bibliothèque Nationale (Paris: 1895), pp. 373–374, 408–409.
 Hermann von Soden, "Die Schriften des Neuen Testaments, in ihrer ältesten erreichbaren Textgestalt hergestellt auf Grund ihrer Textgeschichte", Verlag von Arthur Glaue, Berlin 1902-1910, p. 72.
 U. B. Schmid, D. C. Parker, W. J. Elliott, The Gospel according to St. John: The majuscules (Brill 2007), pp. 129–130. [text of the codex]

Greek New Testament uncials
8th-century biblical manuscripts
Bibliothèque nationale de France collections